Bebearia tentyris, or Hewitson's forester, is a butterfly in the family Nymphalidae. It is found in Ivory Coast, Ghana, Togo, Nigeria, Cameroon, the Republic of the Congo, the Democratic Republic of the Congo and Uganda. The habitat consists of forests, especially drier forests.

The larvae feed on Hypselodelphys species.

Subspecies
Bebearia tentyris tentyris (Ivory Coast, Ghana, Togo, Nigeria, Cameroon)
Bebearia tentyris seeldrayersi (Aurivillius, 1899) (Congo, western Democratic Republic of the Congo, Uganda)

References

Butterflies described in 1866
tentyris
Butterflies of Africa
Taxa named by William Chapman Hewitson